Sadhna Bangla is an Indian spiritual television network owned and operated by Sadhna Group. Launched in February 2016 and is available on all major distribution platforms across West Bengal and India.

External links
 Official Sadhana TV website

Religious television channels in India
Television channels and stations established in 2016
Religious television
Indian direct broadcast satellite services